Arnold Bogumil Ehrlich (15 January 1848 in Volodovka, Brest-Litovsk – November 1919 in New Rochelle, New York) was a scholar of bible and rabbinics whose work spanned the latter part of the 19th and the early 20th century.  A formidable scholar, he is said to have possessed perfect recall, with an outstanding knowledge of Bible and Talmud, and to have spoken 39 languages.  He is best known for his book Mikra Kiphshuto (The Bible according to its Literal Meaning) in three Hebrew volumes published from 1899–1901, in which he sought to bring the results of modern textual criticism of the Bible to a wider Hebrew audience, emphasising the Torah to be a document made by humans complete with scribal and copying errors, not a perfect work dictated to Moses at Sinai; and as a formative intellectual influence on the young Mordecai Kaplan. Ehrlich earned a living as a private tutor, and teaching at the Hebrew Preparatory School of the Temple Emanu-El Theological School of New York.  However, he was never considered for a professorial post at Hebrew Union College, apparently because in his early twenties he had helped the German Lutheran theologian Franz Delitzsch revise his Hebrew translation of the New Testament, a work used to proselytize Jewish converts to Christianity.

Ehrlich's exegetical work is an important contribution to modern biblical exegesis. Ehrlich's work was highly influential on the Jewish translation produced by the Jewish Publication Society in 1917 and its successor of 1962–82.

Life 
Born Jewish in Volodovka, near Brest-Litovsk, now Belarus. At an early age he studied German in his village, and had read the Bible in the Moses Mendelssohn translation. Ehrlich was married at fourteen and had one son named Mark. At seventeen, Ehrlich came to the conclusion that he could no longer abide the stringencies of his environment and he sought association with the wider fields of knowledge he hoped to find in Germany. His wife did not agree with the move or his liberal views, and she and their son did not go with him to Germany. He then went on his own and he entered school there to learn arithmetic, geography, and other elementary school subjects alongside boys of ten. Such subjects were simple for a lad who started learning the German language at the age of five years.

He also worked as a librarian in the Semitics department of the Berlin Royal Library. It was at this time in Germany that Ehrlich somehow came to the attention of Professor Franz Delitzsch, who engaged him as his amanuensis. They both worked in the missionary Institutum Judaicum and this association would turn into an evil spectre later in his life. At Delitzsch's insistence Ehrlich revised the Hebrew translation of the New Testament (10th Edition) which was to be utilized for proselytization among Jews. During this time he encountered the work of Julius Wellhausen, Kuehnen, and the whole school of Biblical criticism which fascinated him. This in turn made him accept the theory that the Bible was constructed of a patchwork quilt of documents, but his later work was a revolt against the destructiveness of the "higher criticism." The Hebrew language was bred into his bones, and it became his conviction that the Bible could be understood only as one devoted oneself to its language and to an understanding of the Hebrew idiom through its cognates. There are rumors that Ehrlich was baptized in Germany, but there is no proof or evidence of this. Had it been true, the officers at the Temple Emanu-El would never had considered him for a place as a teacher (not professor) in the Emanu-El Theological School of New York where he taught after he immigrated to Manhattan, New York from Hamburg, Germany in 1874. His Naturalization date is July 11, 1881, and he lists his occupation as "Teacher of Languages."

Ehrlich wrote in fluent English and spoke it fluently and flawlessly, though with a slight accent. He was a close student of many languages, and was both a philologist and a student of the Hebrew Bible.  He knew 39 tongues, which included all the Semitic languages, all the languages of Western Europe except Finnish, all the Slavic language dialects, as well as Sanskrit, Latin, and Greek. He explained the relationship that Israelite and Canaanite civilizations bear to that of the Greeks upon the basis of language similarities and idiomatic likeness. In his "leisure" he had written what was practically a Randglossen to both the Iliad and the Odyssey. He was a lover of the Greek classics and had a great comprehension of classic civilizations. He had a special love for Arabic. He enjoyed it as a language and he enjoyed its literature and its poetry. Many of those who taught Arabic in the Semitics departments of universities came to Ehrlich for instruction, and among them was Professor Richard J. H. Gottheil of Columbia University, son of Gustav Gottheil, who claimed that Ehrlich had admitted to changing his faith to Christianity in Germany and was remorseful for it. This declaration was never signed by Ehrlich, but only by witnesses "claiming" this event took place in the late 19th century.

During his years in the United States, Jewish scholars and students sought him out, but Ehrlich surely paid a frightful price for that New Testament translation he did at a young age with Delitzsch. Many regard this translation as a beautiful piece of modern Hebrew composition, but it cost him and he was to pay for it throughout his life. He was sorely resentful of the fact that, despite general recognition of his status as a scholar, he had not been chosen Professor of Bible at the Hebrew Union College. He was never invited to teach in either of the major rabbinical seminaries and among the Orthodox he was disliked. No one wanted to appoint a man with a background of engaging in a New Testament translation, who would invite criticism from all conservative quarters. He also insisted upon "mister" with his pupils because no university had ever granted him a higher academic degree.

He is the author of a biblical commentary called Mik'ra Kiph'shuto ("The Plain Meaning of the Bible"). It embodies his main point of view that the Bible itself is the best source for the knowledge of Hebrew as a language and for the ancient Hebraic ideas, even though the cross references of comparative passages or words might be separated in widely disparate ages. He felt that somehow original meanings persisted and that the cross references or parallel passages often shed light upon obscure sentences as well as upon mistakes in the original Bible text. Modern archaeology has opened new vistas through the centuries, but Ehrlich had no knowledge, in his time, of what the future would bring into this realm.

He had a strong influence on the young Mordecai Kaplan.
Ehrlich's strongest affection was for Louis Ginzberg of the Jewish Theological Seminary. He admired Dr. Ginzberg's thoroughness, his vast and comprehensive knowledge, and the originality of his mind. He also had a high regard for Professors Malter and Margolis of the Dropsie College. But Ehrlich had no doubts as to his own status, for he was convinced of his own superiority in his chosen area of research.

Ehrlich was antisocial in his life in that he felt uncomfortable and uneasy in ordinary human relationships. But he was completely social in his outlook, in his passion for justice, in his desire for the self-realization of all people regardless of race, color or creed. He was totally removed from people and came alive only when he discussed his philological interests.
He was an avid reader in all fields, particularly in philosophy, and maintained a steady correspondence with Hermann Cohen until his death one year before Ehrlich. As a matter of self-discipline, he required himself to read through Immanuel Kant's Critique of Pure Reason every year. 
Ehrlich's one diversion  was to attend the movies of the early 20th century. He adored Westerns and historic presentations. The great scholar could watch these films and find complete "escape." He preferred this to spending time with people, whom he avoided.
He was entranced by the new sociology, despite his personal social discomfort, and was intrigued by the new Freudian psychology emerging upon the scene in his latter years. Not long before he died, Richard M. Stern (who prepared for the rabbinate under him) recalls Ehrlich saying, if he could relive his years, he would like to give greater attention to psychology so as to understand why some human beings are driven perforce into defined areas of activity and why others are willing to remain "contented cows!!!"

Ehrlich was sought after by many non-Jews who wanted to study under him. Two of his well-known Christian pupils were Dr. Charles Fagnani and Dr. Julius Bewer, both members of the Union Theological Seminary Faculty. He was especially interested in Bewer because he exhibited an unusual aptitude in reading and understanding rabbinic literature. Ehrlich was unhappy that Christian scholarship had not cultivated the area with greater assiduity. He felt he found the perfect Christian disciple who would devote himself to rabbinics, but this did not happen. Bewer chose the field of biblical criticism  in the tradition of Wellhausen and his coterie. Ehrlich had no love for this group and thoroughly disliked the "Higher Anti-Semitism."

A few years prior to 1917 he discovered that he had not been included in the committee appointed by the Jewish Publication Society and the Central Conference of American Rabbis to prepare a new translation of the Hebrew Bible. When the work was published in 1917, he was furious that the committee used his name as a consultant.

Ehrlich was an occasional attendant at religious services and synagogues where he hoped to find preachers who could use the biblical text with the related midrashic or other rabbinic commentaries. He disliked the Union Prayer Book, primarily because he felt that its reform of the liturgy had not gone far enough. He felt that all the passages which belittled human dignity should be revised or eliminated. He believed that a modern Jewish prayer book should, of course, be rooted in traditional forms, but that prayers which involved a servile humility were unbecoming to modern man and should be rewritten.

Many of the older generation rabbis studied under him at one time or another, either at Emanu-El or as private pupils. Among them were Samuel Schulman, Leon Harrison, Bernard Drachman, Stephen S. Wise, and George Alexander Kohut whose father was Alexander Kohut. Another of his mature students was Isaac S. Moses, rabbi of the Central Synagogue.

Ehrlich was married twice. His son Mark, from his first wife, was born in Poland and arrived in Manhattan, New York in 1885 without his mother. 
His second wife, Pauline (October 13, 1858-?), of Austrian descent, gave birth to a daughter named Olga born 1881 in Manhattan, New York.  He had four grandchildren. Mark had Rose (1891), Joseph (1897) and Helen (1902) Ehrlich in Manhattan. Olga married Dr. Julius Auerbach and had a son named Arnold (1912). Arnold M. Auerbach became a distinguished playwright, essayist, humorist, critic, and an American Emmy-Award winning screenwriter.
Rose Ehrlich was an accomplished pianist who was written about in a lost book for her talent.

According to the January 10, 1920 Nation News Archive:

The death of Arnold B. Ehrlich, which occurred in the city of New York a short time ago, has deprived the world of Biblical scholarship of one of its most brilliant exponents. Ehrlich was not officially connected with any institution of learning; his name is little known outside of the narrow circle of professional Bible students, and is possibly not sufficiently known even among them. Yet, his life work, represented by eleven substantial volumes dedicated to the elucidation of the Scriptures, merits the grateful appreciation of all those to whom the Bible is an integral part of human civilization.

Ehrlich's exegetical work is an important contribution to modern biblical exegesis. Ehrlich's work was highly influential on the Jewish translation produced by the Jewish Publication Society in 1917 and its successor of 1962–82.

Works 
His best known works are, 
  Mik'ra Kiph'shuto (מקרא כפשוטו) [The Bible Literally]. Leipzig: 3 vols, 1899–1901; reprinted New York: Ktav, 1969.
  Randglossen zur Hebräischen Bibel; textkritisches, sprachliches und sachliches [Notes on the Hebrew Bible]. Leipzig: J.C. Hinrichs. 7 vols, 1908–14; reprinted Hildesheim: Georg Olms, 1968. .  His most substantial work, which took six years to complete and which was funded by Jacob H. Schiff and Dr. Isaac Adler.

He also prepared textbooks to introduce students to rabbinic literature and prepared an anthology of aggadic passages representative of material that students might later have to study at the Emanu-El Theological School that he taught at.

His poetic German translation of the Psalms had wide acclaim in its day, but this volume is now out of print and may be found only in large university libraries.
His scholarly work is written in German because, prior to World War I, German was regarded as the language of Jewish scholarship.

Unpublished notebooks can be found at the New York library of the Hebrew Union College-Jewish Institute of Religion. These notebooks are the addenda to the Randglossen.

References

Further reading
 American Jewish Archives; vol. xxiii; no. 1; April, 1971
 The teshuva of Arnold Ehrlich on Ehrlich's apostasy and return to his faith [url no longer supports images]
 Judaism Faces the Twentieth Century on Mordecai Kaplan's relationship with Ehrlich.
 "Ehrlich's Monumental Work on the Old Testament" review of Randglossen zur hebraischen Bibel, textkritisches, sprachliches und sachliches by Arnold B. Ehrlich. Review by Julius A. Bewer The American Journal of Theology, Vol. 20, No. 2 (Apr., 1916), pp. 274–275 
 "Some Hitherto Unrecognized Meanings of the Verb Shub" by Robert Gordis Journal of Biblical Literature, Vol. 52, No. 2/3 (Jun. - Sep., 1933), pp. 153–162  "The starting point for our inquiry is the acute observation of that master of Biblical Hebrew, Arnold B. Ehrlich."
 "Arnold B. Ehrlich: A Personal Recollection" by R M Stern, available on http://americanjewisharchives.org/journal/PDF/1971_23_01_00_stern.pdf

External links 
 Mik'ra Kiph'shutah by Arnold Ehrlich (Shabbatei ben Yom Tov ibn Boded) is available here.

1848 births
1919 deaths
19th-century Polish rabbis
Talmudists
19th-century Jewish biblical scholars
Translators of the Bible into German
American people of German-Jewish descent
American people of Polish-Jewish descent
People from New Rochelle, New York
Jewish translators of the Bible
19th-century translators
20th-century Jewish biblical scholars
Polish biblical scholars
American biblical scholars
American humanists
Jewish humanists
American male writers
American religious writers
Jewish religious writers
American translators
Polish translators
Jewish translators
Jewish American writers
Jewish philosophers
Jewish skeptics
American Hebraists
Polish Hebraists
American orientalists
Jewish orientalists
Polish orientalists
Bible commentators
Jewish theologians
Jewish linguists
Linguists from the United States
Linguists from Poland